Cyana fulvia is a moth of the family Erebidae. It was described by Carl Linnaeus in his 1758 10th edition of Systema Naturae. It is found in Sierra Leone.

References

Cyana
Moths described in 1758
Taxa named by Carl Linnaeus